Oybek or Aybek is a station of the Tashkent Metro on Oʻzbekiston Line. The station was opened on 8 December 1984 as part of the inaugural section of the line, between Alisher Navoiy and Toshkent. It is named in honor of the poet known as Aibek. For the first time in Tashkent underground at this station applied column-type platform using earthquake-resistant monolithic structures.
Columns station covered with reddish marble and decorated with a ceramic ornament. On the side walls of the stairs that go down to the platform, decorated with panels on the theme based on the works of Oybek as book pages. On one of them depicts the writer. When finishing the station it is widely used in marble, granite, ceramics and other materials.

Transfer to Ming Orik of Yunusobod Line is available.

References

Tashkent Metro stations
Railway stations opened in 1984